Kerns may refer to:

 Plural of Kern
Kerns (surname)

 Kerns, Ontario, Canada
 Kerns, Portland, Oregon, United States
 Kerns, Switzerland, a village and municipality

See also 

 
 Kernstown, Virginia, United States
 Battle of Kernstown (disambiguation)
 Kern (disambiguation)